The Bonneville Environmental Foundation (BEF) is a national non-profit organization that focuses on water, carbon and energy solutions to help combat climate change and water scarcity. It was founded in 1998 to support watershed restoration programs and develop new sources of renewable energy and has expanded to include K-12 energy education.

BEF Carbon Offsets and Renewable Energy Certificates
BEF sells Carbon Offsets and Renewable Energy Certificates to corporations, non-profit organizations, government entities, utilities, and individuals to help mitigate the carbon impacts of industry and society.

Renewable Energy Group
The Renewable Energy Group (REG), collaborates with utilities and other funding partners to foster knowledge and excitement about renewable energy technology by delivering hands-on experience with solar electricity to students and communities throughout the United States.

REG has managed BEF's renewable energy demonstration projects and renewable energy educational outreach under the Solar 4R Schools program (S4RS). Solar 4R Schools provided solar-electric system installations, in-class activities, science kits, teacher training and event management to schools, libraries and museums and other community centers.

A 64 kW community-funded solar project is under construction in Ashland, Oregon.

Watershed
BEF implemented a 10-year Model Watershed restoration funding strategy. It commits long-term resources and support to achieve meaningful and lasting improvements to river and stream ecosystems. It support allows local groups to measure results and adapt and improve strategies over time, ensuring that its programs produce lasting ecological changes that will benefit humans and native species for centuries.

See also 
 Stateline Wind Project

References

External links 
Official website

Environmental organizations based in the United States